The 2005 CAF Champions League Final was a football tie held over two legs in December 2005 between Al Ahly, and Étoile du Sahel.

Qualified teams
In the following table, finals until 1996 were in the African Cup of Champions Club era, since 1997 were in the CAF Champions League era.

Background
Al Ahly reached a total of four finals, winning three (1982, 1987, 2001) and losing one (1983).
Étoile du Sahel reached the second consecutive final in his history after they lost against Enyimba in the previous edition 2004.

Both teams qualified as winners of their groups. Both teams also qualified for the semifinals on the second-last matchday. In the semifinals Étoile du Sahel defeated the Moroccan side Raja Casablanca 2–0 on aggregate, after winning twice with the same result (1–0): the first leg in Casablanca, and the second leg in Sousse. Al Ahly faced his compatriot Zamalek winning the first leg (2–1) and the second leg (2–0) after playing the two matches in Cairo.

Venues

Stade Olympique de Sousse

Stade olympique de Sousse is a multi-purpose stadium in Sousse, Tunisia.  It is used by the football team Étoile du Sahel, and was used for the 2004 African Cup of Nations.  The stadium holds 28,000 people.
It hosts within it the meetings played by the football team of the city: Étoile sportive du Sahel (ESS). 

For many decades, Sousse footballers knew only the clay surfaces and knew the turf surfaces only when the stadium was inaugurated with an initial capacity of 10,000 places.
It passes over the years to 15,000 seats and is then expanded again on the occasion of the 1994 African Cup of Nations with 6,000 additional seats to reach a capacity of 21,000 seats; A luminous panel is installed at the same time. 
The last expansion was carried out in 1999 to bring the capacity of the stadium to 28,000 seats for the 2001 Mediterranean Games, a reorganization of the gallery of honor was carried out, from a capacity of 70 to 217 places.

It hosted 1977 FIFA World Youth Championship, 1994 African Cup of Nations, 2001 Mediterranean Games and 2004 African Cup of Nations.

Cairo Military Academy Stadium

Cairo Military Academy Stadium is located in Cairo, Egypt and has a total capacity of 28,500.

Seven miles up the road from Cairo International Stadium, heading for Cairo International Airport, there is the Cairo Military Academy Stadium at the far end of Orouba Street in the north-eastern Heliopolis district of Cairo.

It was built in 1989 for the use of military teams and students at the military academy. The ground accommodated home games of Al Ahly and Zamalek during the refurbishing of the Cairo International Stadium and occasionally still serves to stage matches of the old foes.

Al Ahly was forced to move out of its usual stadium, that is, the Cairo International Stadium, due to the work that started in it because of Egypt organizing the 2006 Africa Cup of Nations after three months, it underwent a major renovation, and was brought up to 21st century world standard along with all its multi-game Olympic facilities.

Road to final

Format
The final was decided over two legs, with aggregate goals used to determine the winner. If the sides were level on aggregate after the second leg, the away goals rule would have been applied, and if still level, the tie would have proceeded directly to a penalty shootout (no extra time is played).

Matches

First leg

Second leg

Assistant referees:
Losséni Paré (Burkina Faso)
Brama Millogo (Burkina Faso)
Fourth official:
Nasser Sadek (Egypt)

Notes and references

External links
2005 CAF Champions League - cafonline.com

Final
2005
1
Al Ahly SC matches
Étoile Sportive du Sahel matches